The World Forum (originally known as Nederlands Congresgebouw and formerly Nederlands Congres Centrum and World Forum Convention Center) is a concert venue and convention centre in The Hague, Netherlands, near the buildings of the International Criminal Tribunal for the former Yugoslavia, the Organisation for the Prohibition of Chemical Weapons and one of the administrative offices of the International Baccalaureate.

History
It was opened in 1969 and was designed in the Dutch functionalism style by architect Jacobus Johannes Pieter Oud. His son, Hans Oud, completed the construction after his father's death in 1963.

In 2006 a part of the convention center, including the Statenhal, was demolished to make place for the Europol building. Many concerts and festivals had been held there before, such as the annual North Sea Jazz Festival, and the Eurovision Song Contests of 1976 and 1980. Between 2006 and 2010 The Hague Jazz festival was held at the World Forum (to replace the moved North Sea Jazz festival, which is now held in Rotterdam). Since 2011 the festival is held in the Kyocera Stadium.

Events
Nederlands Congresgebouw
Wings – 20 to 21 August 1972
Eurovision Song Contest – 1976 and 1980
North Sea Jazz Festival – 1976 till 2005 
National Song Festival – 22 February 1978 (won by Harmony with their song 't Is OK)
Finch – 14 November 1978 (their final concert)
Eric Clapton – 24 February 1990
48th World Science Fiction Convention – 23 to 27 August 1990
Toto – 30 November 1990
a-ha – 4 April 1991

Nederlands Congres Centrum
Celine Dion – 27 May 1995
Backstreet Boys – 9 December 1996
Sarah Brightman – 22 May 1999
Laura Pausini – 18 January 2002
Laura Pausini – 13 March 2005

World Forum Convention Center
The Hague Jazz – 2006 till 2010 
International Conference on Afghanistan – 31 March 2009
Meet the Future, Science & Technology Summit – 18 November 2010
The Hague International Model United Nations (THIMUN) – Annually

World Forum
AnimeCon - Anime Convention – Annually
Nuclear Security Summit – 24 to 25 March 2014
Nick Cave  – 16 to 17 May 2015

See also
 List of convention centres in the Netherlands

References

External links

 of the World Forum
 of AnimeCon

Convention centres in the Netherlands
Buildings and structures in The Hague
Tourist attractions in South Holland